In Greek mythology, Hyamus (Ancient Greek: Ὕαμος) was a son of Lycorus and possibly Evadne. It was related of him that after the Great Deluge, he became king over a people dwelling around Mount Parnassus, and founded Hyampolis. He was married to Melantheia, a daughter of Deucalion, and had at least two daughters, Celaeno and Melanis, of whom either might have been mother of Delphus.

Notes

References 

 Pausanias, Description of Greece with an English Translation by W.H.S. Jones, Litt.D., and H.A. Ormerod, M.A., in 4 Volumes. Cambridge, MA, Harvard University Press; London, William Heinemann Ltd. 1918. . Online version at the Perseus Digital Library
 Pausanias, Graeciae Descriptio. 3 vols. Leipzig, Teubner. 1903.  Greek text available at the Perseus Digital Library.

Princes in Greek mythology
Kings of Phocis
Kings in Greek mythology
Phocian characters in Greek mythology
Mythology of Phocis